The Kingdom of the Netherlands and its predecessor states have been engaged in a significant number of armed conflicts since 1560. During the first war after 1560, namely the Eighty Years' War (1566–1648), the set of united provinces that would later become the Dutch Republic proclaimed its independence in 1581.
 United Provinces, or Dutch Republic (1581–1795)
 Batavian Republic (1795–1806)
 Kingdom of Holland (1806–1810)
 Sovereign Principality of the United Netherlands (1813–1815)
 United Kingdom of the Netherlands (1815–1839)
 Kingdom of the Netherlands (1839–present)
 For earlier wars, see List of wars in the Low Countries until 1560.
 For simultaneous wars in the south, see
List of wars in the southern Low Countries (1560–1829) – includes wars on the present territory of Belgium and Luxembourg, including the Southern Netherlands (Spanish Netherlands & Austrian Netherlands), the Principality of Liège, the Princely Abbey of Stavelot-Malmedy, the Prince-Bishopric of Cambrésis and the Imperial City of Cambray, the Duchy of Bouillon and smaller states.
List of wars involving Belgium (1830–present)
List of wars involving Luxembourg (1890–present)

United Provinces (1581–1795)

Batavian Republic (1795–1806)

Kingdom of Holland (1806–1810)

Sovereign Principality of the United Netherlands (1813–1815)

United Kingdom of the Netherlands (1815–1839)

Netherlands (1839–present)

Notes

References

Netherlands
Wars